This is a list of submarines of World War II, which began with the German invasion of Poland on 1 September 1939 and ended with the surrender of Japan on 2 September 1945.

Germany used submarines to devastating effect in the Battle of the Atlantic, where it attempted to cut Britain's supply routes by sinking more merchant ships than Britain could replace. While U-boats destroyed a significant number of ships, the strategy ultimately failed. Although U-boats had been updated in the interwar years, the major innovation was improved communications and encryption; allowing for mass-attack naval tactics. By the end of the war, almost 3,000 Allied ships (175 warships, 2,825 merchantmen) had been sunk by U-boats.

The Imperial Japanese Navy operated the most varied fleet of submarines of any navy, including Kaiten crewed torpedoes, midget submarines ( and es), medium-range submarines, purpose-built supply submarines and long-range fleet submarines. They also had submarines with the highest submerged speeds (s) and submarines that could carry multiple aircraft (s). They were also equipped with one of the most advanced torpedoes of the conflict, the oxygen-propelled Type 95.

The submarine force was the most effective anti-ship weapon in the United States Navy arsenal. Although constituting only about 2 percent of the U.S. naval force, submarine force destroyed over 30 percent of the Imperial Japanese Navy, and over 60 percent of the Japanese merchant fleet, The Royal Navy Submarine Service was used primarily to blockade trade and military supply routes to Africa and the Near and Far East, but also obtained the only mutually submerged submarine-to-submarine combat kill of World War II.

Excluding special underwater craft such as midget submarines, the German Kriegsmarine lost 765 submarines to all causes during World War II in addition to 150 submarines scuttled in German-held ports in northern Europe during the first week of May 1945 by their crews to avoid surrendering them to the Allies, while Japan lost 129 submarines and Italy 91. The Royal Navy lost 73 and the U.S. Navy 52 submarines, while France lost 59. The Soviet Union′s submarine losses are not necessarily fully known, but the Soviet Navy probably lost 98 submarines.

Submarines show submerged displacement in long tons.

See also
 Submarines of the Imperial Japanese Navy
 List of specifications of submarines of World War II
 List of ships of World War II
 List of World War II ships of less than 1000 tons

References

Bibliography

 
 

 
Submarines
World War II